Izu Azuka (born 24 May 1989) is a Nigerian football player who is currently playing for Fasil Kenema S.C. in Ethiopian Premier League.

Club career
On 26 November 2008, Azuka signed a two-year contract with Algerian club JS Kabylie after playing with Nigerian side Sharks F.C. In December 2010, his contract was not renewed as he made just 4 league appearances in the 2010–11 season.

On 2 January 2011, Azuka joined Libyan side Al-Ittihad Tripoli on a free transfer from JS Kabylie.

He then signed for Sunshine Stars F.C. of Akure in December 2011, a squad which eliminated Ittihad in the 2011 CAF Confederation Cup.

On 7 September 2012, Tunisian club Espérance de Tunis announced that they had reached a deal with Sunshine Stars for Azuka. He joined the club in December when the transfer window opens and sign a three and a half-year contract.

In February 2015, Azuka joined Kazakhstan Premier League side FC Irtysh Pavlodar on a one-year contract. Moving to fellow Kazakhstan Premier League side FC Taraz July of the same year.

Azuka joined Turkish side Yeni Malatyaspor at 4 January 2016.

International career
He was called up by Olympic coach Augustine Eguavoen for the June 2011 qualifier against Tanzania.

Career statistics

Club

References

External links
 DZFoot Profile
 

1989 births
Living people
Nigerian footballers
Nigerian expatriate footballers
Footballers from Rivers State
Sportspeople from Port Harcourt
Expatriate footballers in Algeria
Expatriate footballers in Libya
Expatriate footballers in Tunisia
Expatriate footballers in Turkey
Expatriate footballers in Kazakhstan
Nigerian expatriate sportspeople in Algeria
Nigerian expatriate sportspeople in Libya
Nigerian expatriate sportspeople in Tunisia
Nigerian expatriate sportspeople in Kazakhstan
Nigerian expatriate sportspeople in Turkey
Algerian Ligue Professionnelle 1 players
TFF First League players
Sharks F.C. players
JS Kabylie players
Al-Ittihad Club (Tripoli) players
Espérance Sportive de Tunis players
CS Hammam-Lif players
Gaziantep F.K. footballers
Kahramanmaraşspor footballers
Yeni Malatyaspor footballers
Association football forwards
Libyan Premier League players